Kitzbühel railway station, sometimes known as Kitzbühel Hauptbahnhof (German for Kitzbühel Central) to distinguish it from nearby Hahnenkamm and Schwarzsee stations, is the main railway station for the resort town of Kitzbühel, Tyrol, Austria. The station is a major stop for local, regional and international services on the Salzburg-Tyrol railway, served by the Tyrol S-Bahn, Regional-Express (REX) and some EuroCity (EC) services.  

The station was rebuilt in 2010. It is served daily by the Transalpin service from Zurich Hauptbahnhof to Graz Hauptbahnhof.

References

External links 
 
 

Railway stations in Tyrol (state)